VLD can mean:
 Open Vlaamse Liberalen en Democraten
 Very-low-drag bullet
 Valdosta Regional Airport, IATA airport code
 Voltron: Legendary Defender
 Abbreviation for Vlaardingen